Actors and Sin is a 1952 American comedy film written, produced and directed by Ben Hecht. The film marks Edward G. Robinson's second film with actress Marsha Hunt. It is also known by its section names of Actor's Blood and Woman of Sin. Lee Garmes was codirector and cinematographer, as he was on most of the films that Hecht directed.

Plot
The film lampoons the Hollywood motion picture industry and is separated into two sections. The first section is Actor's Blood, a morality play about legitimate theater. The second section is Woman of Sin, a send-up of Hollywood greed.

Actor's Blood takes place in New York City. Broadway star Marcia Tillayou has been found shot dead in her apartment. Her father Maurice is himself an actor, and had watched her theater career rise as his own declined. She had let success overcome her, and had thus alienated critics, fans, producers and her playwright husband. She had a few recent stage flops before being murdered.

Woman of Sin takes place in Hollywood. Dishonest writers' agent Orlando Higgens has been receiving frantic calls from Daisy Marcher about a screenplay that she had written titled Woman of Sin. Thinking they are crank calls, Higgens tells her to never again call his office. He then learns that because of a mail mixup, her screenplay had been received by film mogul J.B. Cobb, a man who had once passed on Gone With the Wind based on Higgins' advice. Cobb thinks that Higgins sent the script and offers him a lucrative sum for the rights. However, Higgins does not know where Daisy is or that she is actually a nine-year-old child.

Cast
Actor's Blood sequence:

Dan O'Herlihy as Alfred O'Shea, Narrator
Edward G. Robinson as Maurice Tillayou
Marsha Hunt as Marcia Tillayou
Rudolph Anders as Otto Lachsley
Peter Brocco as Frederick Herbert
Robert Carson as Thomas Hayne
Herb Bernard as Emile
Alice Key as Miss Thompson, Tommy
Irene Martin as Mrs. Murray
Joseph Mell as George Murray
Ric Roman as Clyde Veering
Elizabeth Root as Mrs. Herbert

Woman of Sin sequence:

Ben Hecht as Narrator
Eddie Albert as Orlando Higgens
Alan Reed as Jerome (J.B.) Cobb
Jenny Hecht as Millicent Egelhofer, Daisy Marcher
George Baxter as Vincent Brown
John Crawford as Gilbert, Movie Actor
Douglas Evans as Mr. Devlin
Paul Guilfoyle as Mr. Blue
Sam Rosen as Danello 
Tracey Roberts as Miss Flanagan
Toni Carroll as Millicent, Movie Star
Jody Gilbert as Mrs. Egelhofer
George Keymas as Bill Sweitzer, Producer
Alan Mendez as Captain Moriarity
Kathleen Mulqueen as Miss Wright
Cameo appearances by:
Betty Field, Louis B. Mayer, and Jack L. Warner

Reception
In a contemporary review for The New York Times, critic Howard Thompson characterized the film as "an almost reverential close-up of a stage actor's senile egomania and an atomically conceived blast at front-office intellectuality in the film factories." Thompson called Actor's Blood a "stiff, glum and narcissistic tale ... the whole episode flounders midway between a conversational seance and a straight farce" and Woman of Sin "straight farce, with an idea so devastatingly impudent that only Mr. Hecht could claim it."

In reference to the film's two sections, DVD Talk writes "Both are light, breezy, and inconsequential, though admittedly written with an expert's ear for dialogue and a knack for clever story twists." They write that both sections "move at an efficient pace", and praise Ben Hecht for the dialog and rhythm of his scripts. They also note that the actors were well chosen, finding flaw only in the child actors used in the Woman of Sin segment. They did have critique about the material itself, noting that while Hecht knew his way around both Hollywood and Broadway, the subject matter comes off as a little "too inside". They were also disappointed in the two stories, finding the plotlines "fairly hokey and predictable". However, and despite the "hackneyed narrative", they found the film overall to be "very watchable", in that Hecht's sense of timing kept the project from being boring.

DVD Verdict wrote that "the most intriguing element" of the film, and not properly promoted by the film's trailer, is that "it is actually two brief films combined in one package." In analyzing Actor's Blood, they wrote that there was "an opportunity for insight and depth in this story, but it would seem that Mr. Hecht wrote the screenplay while in a blind rage." They offered that the material might even have been comedic but for it being "preposterously heavy-handed". They felt that the actors generally spoke each line over-dramatically and floundered, with only Edward G. Robinson "able to make this work within the context of his character". In their analysis of Woman of Sin, they found it to be "reasonably engaging early on as a breezy satire", despite the concept of a story written by a nine-year-old "earning words of praise and adoration from the likes of Jack Warner and Louis B. Mayer". They noted that the cameos by the studio heads were amusing, but that the story was derailed by the use of Ben Hecht's daughter Jenny in the role of child screenwriter Daisy Marcher. They felt that she was "fingernails-on-a-blackboard grating" in this role, in that she "dials up every aspect of precociousness that can afflict a child actor as high as it can possibly go, and her presence effectively destroys any sense of comic momentum that the film had built up to that point," making her use a clear example of the problems inherent in nepotism. They concluded that the film would stand as "an interesting curiosity for Hollywood history buffs, but fails as a cinematic experience."

Controversy
Upon original release, several theater chains refused to screen the film because it lampoons of stage and screen. This resulted in a lawsuit by United Artists and Sid Kuller Productions against the A. B. C. Theatres Company.

References

External links

 

1952 films
Films directed by Ben Hecht
American comedy-drama films
1952 comedy-drama films
American black-and-white films
Films with screenplays by Ben Hecht
Films scored by George Antheil
United Artists films
1950s English-language films
1950s American films